Krnjevo  is a small town in the municipality of Velika Plana, Serbia. According to the 2002 census, the town has a population of 4,253 people. The area, with its rich black soils, belongs to the Smederevo wine region which also includes Smederevo, Grocka, and Pozarevac.

Notable people
 Velibor Jonić, a member of the fascist movement ZBOR and a Serbian Commissioner of Education during World War II
Kosta Manojlović (1890–1949), composer
 Aleksandar Tirnanić, Yugoslavian footballer

References

Populated places in Podunavlje District